Cheng Xiaolei (born 17 April 1981) is a Chinese short track speed skater. She competed in two events at the 2006 Winter Olympics.

References

1981 births
Living people
Chinese female short track speed skaters
Olympic short track speed skaters of China
Short track speed skaters at the 2006 Winter Olympics
Sportspeople from Jilin
Asian Games medalists in short track speed skating
Short track speed skaters at the 2007 Asian Winter Games
Medalists at the 2007 Asian Winter Games
Asian Games gold medalists for China
21st-century Chinese women